Cara Black and Elena Likhovtseva were the defending champions, but none competed this year. Black competed in Sydney at the same week, while Likhovtseva decided to focus only on the singles competition.

Shinobu Asagoe and Seiko Okamoto won the title by defeating Els Callens and Barbara Schett 2–6, 6–4, 6–3 in the final.

Seeds
The first two seeds received a bye into the quarterfinals.

Draw

Draw

References
 Official results archive (ITF)
 Official results archive (WTA)

2004 WTA Tour